Frederick Ernest Schaaf (September 27, 1908 – February 14, 1933) was a professional boxer who was a heavyweight contender in the 1930s but died after a bout.

Career
In the 1930s he went 2 wins, 1 loss with Tommy Loughran, easily outpointed two future heavyweight world champions in Max Baer in their first fight in 1930 and James J. Braddock in 1931. He also outpointed future title challengers Young Stribling and Tony Galento in 1932.

During a second fight with Baer, on 31 August 1932, Schaaf suffered a severe beating and knockout in the final round, hitting the mat two seconds before the final bell, which saved him from an official knockout – Baer won on points.  It took several minutes for Schaaf to be revived.  Schaaf complained of headaches thereafter, and some observers believe that he suffered brain damage.

Six months later, on 10 February 1933, Schaaf fought the huge (more than ) Primo Carnera, and suffered a knockout loss in the 13th round of 15.  He fell into a coma, and was rushed to the hospital to undergo surgery.  He died on Valentine's Day. An autopsy revealed that Schaaf had meningitis, a swelling of the brain, and he was still recovering from a severe case of influenza when he entered the ring with Carnera.

Record
Schaaf has an official record of 55–13–2 with 1 no contest and 4 no decisions, but the no-decision bouts are due to the scoring practices of the era.  Newspaper reports indicate that he won 3 of those, and lost one.

Professional boxing record
All information in this section is derived from BoxRec, unless otherwise stated.

Official record

All newspaper decisions are officially regarded as “no decision” bouts and are not counted in the win/loss/draw column.

Unofficial record

Record with the inclusion of newspaper decisions in the win/loss/draw column.

References

External links
 
Fallen & Forgotten: The Ernie Schaaf Story

1908 births
1933 deaths
Deaths due to injuries sustained in boxing
Boxers from New Jersey
Sportspeople from Elizabeth, New Jersey
Sports deaths in New York (state)
American male boxers
Heavyweight boxers